Knut Höhne (born 19 November 1949) is a German fencer. He competed in the individual and team sabre events at the 1972 Summer Olympics.

References

1949 births
Living people
German male fencers
Olympic fencers of West Germany
Fencers at the 1972 Summer Olympics
Sportspeople from Lübeck